The 1974 California lieutenant gubernatorial election was held on November 5, 1974. Democratic nominee Mervyn Dymally narrowly defeated Republican incumbent John L. Harmer with 49.19% of the vote.

Primary elections
Primary elections were held on June 4, 1974.

Democratic primary

Candidates
Mervyn Dymally, State Senator
Lawrence E. Walsh, State Senator
Howard Miller
Elizabeth Smith Weingand
Robert Battin
Fidel González Jr.
A. John Merlo
Cy King

Results

Republican primary

Candidates
John L. Harmer, State Senator
John Veneman, State Assemblyman

Results

General election

Candidates
Major party candidates
Mervyn Dymally, Democratic
John L. Harmer, Republican

Other candidates
Marilyn Seals, Peace and Freedom
Alberta M. Procell, American Independent

Results

References

California
1974
Lieutenant